The freezing point depression osmometer is an osmometer that is used in determining a solution's osmotic concentration as its osmotically active aspects depress its freezing point. Osmometry further involves other techniques that including membrane osmometry which determines the osmotic pressure of solutions and vapor pressure osmometry which assesses the concentration of particles that minimizes a solution's vapor pressure and melting as well as freezing points of aqueous solutions. 

Freezing point depression osmometry is, however, the most preferred in distinct contexts. In the past, it has been used to assess the osmotic strength of a colloid and solutions. The osmometer uses the solution's freezing point depression to establish its strength. Being efficient, freezing point depression osmometer is used in various medical practices, including pharmaceutical manufacturing, quality control laboratories, and clinical chemistry.

Method 

Freezing point depression osmometers are utilized to determine a solution's osmotic strength. It is the most preferred method which is applicable in performing various activities in the medical field. It is used in assessing the osmotic strength of colloids, as well as solutions. 

The freezing point depression osmometer operates by using the solution's freezing point to determine the concentration of the solution. It uses a nanolitre nanometer, a device that facilitates the establishment of the solution's melting and freezing points. The determination of the freezing and melting points involves four distinct steps: calibration, loading, deep freezing, and determination. By determining the solution's freezing point, it is possible to establish the number of particles in it, an aspect that allows the determination of its concentration. 

When particles are dissolved in a solution, their freezing point is lowered compared to that of the original solvent. A further increase in the solute decreases the freezing point even further. The freezing point depression osmometer uses the solution's freezing point to establish its concentration. The freezing point depression osmometer is calibrated using standards that are within the solution's osmolality range.

History of use 
The use of osmometers began in the late nineteenth century after van’t Hoff won a Nobel Prize for his research and discovery that the relationship between the osmotic pressure of dilute colloid solutions and concentration was consistent with the ideal gas law. Since then, osmometers have been used to measure the osmotic strength of a dilute solution at different levels of concentration.      

The historical use of the method has been validated by Guerrero et al. in an analytical study, in which they tested the urine osmolality of 1,991 dogs. The study discloses the past achievement of professionals where using the approach, they established intervals and the impacts of sex, age, and reproductive status. The historical use of the method is further disclosed by Hale et al. who elaborate on its advantages over the other conventional concentration osmometers, which rely on the osmotic pressure profile.

Current usage in medical fields 
Freezing point depression osmometers are applied in various areas in the medical field. The approach is used in determining the colloidal aspects in solutions.  elaborates that the method is advantageous as compared to other conventional approaches, an aspect that has increased its application in the medical sector. In the present day, the method is applied imong other areas, in measuring osmolarity in lens care solutions as well as eye drops, promoting eye health. It is further used in clinical chemistry, pharmaceutical, and quality control laboratories where it facilitates different processes. As compared to the other methods, the freezing point depression osmometer has a high level of precision and accuracy, making its application in clinical practices safe. It is applied in various processes that involves the manufacturing of drugs. Urine osmolality is also used to measure urine concentration accurately thus determine the renal function and body fluid homeostasis.

Evaluation of its use 
Osmometry is preferred in among other areas, pharmaceutical, quality control laboratories, and clinical chemistry where it facilitates the establishment of precise measurements, hence facilitating the various medical practices. It provides an easy and fast method to determine the osmolality in aqueous solutions. 

The freezing point depression osmometer is largely used in the medical sector where its preference is promoted by its precision. It is used in medical clinics where it is applied in distinct pharmaceutical practices. These include, among other activities, the development of lens care solutions and eye drops where the technique is applied to develop the proper development of a proper solution to promote eye health. Indeed, medical professionals that used this method have achieved significant success both in the past as well as in the present day.

See also
Melting-point depression
Boiling-point elevation
Colligative properties

Further reading
Skoog, D.A.; West, D.M.; Holler, F.J. Fundamentals of Analytical Chemistry New York: Saunders College Publishing, 5th Edition, 1988.
Bard, A.J.; Faulkner, L.R. Electrochemical Methods: Fundamentals and Applications. New York: John Wiley & Sons, 2nd Edition, 2000.
Bettencourt da Silva, R; Bulska, E; Godlewska-Zylkiewicz, B; Hedrich, M; Majcen, N; Magnusson, B; Marincic, S; Papadakis, I; Patriarca, M; Vassileva, E; Taylor, P; Analytical measurement: measurement uncertainty and statistics, 2012, .

External links

 General Chemistry principles, patterns,and applications.

References 

Measuring instruments
Membrane technology